Albert Crawford Howard (February 29, 1828 – July 3, 1910) was an American politician. Between 1877 and 1880 he was lieutenant governor of the state of Rhode Island.

Career 
Albert Howard was the younger brother of Henry Howard (1826-1905) who was Governor of Rhode Island between 1873 and 1875. The sources do not give much information about his life and work. He spent most of his life in Providence County, Rhode Island, where he was involved in commerce and politics. During the civil war he served as a captain in the Union Army.

In 1876, he stood unsuccessfully for Governor of Rhode Island as a National Republican and Prohibition Party candidate. In 1877, Howard was elected Lieutenant Governor of Rhode Island as a Republican alongside Charles C. Van Zandt. He held this office between 1877 and 1880. He was Deputy Governor and Chairman of the State Senate. In 1880, he stood unsuccessfully for Governor as an Independent Republican candidate.

After his time as Lieutenant Governor, he was no longer politically active. Albert Howard spent his old age in Atlanta, where he died on July 3, 1910. He found his final resting place in Providence. Howard was married twice and had six children.

References

External links
 The Political Graveyard

Lieutenant Governors of Rhode Island
1828 births
1910 deaths
Politicians from Cranston, Rhode Island
Rhode Island Republicans
19th-century American politicians